Bulleringa is a national park in Shire of Mareeba, Queensland, Australia, 1,448 km northwest of Brisbane.  The park protects a unique array of vegetation communities and wildlife. The average elevation of the terrain is 325 meters. 170 different species of animals and 360 species of plants have been recorded in the park.

Facilities
Bulleringa has no visitor facilities and there is no public access.

See also

 Protected areas of Queensland

References

National parks of Far North Queensland
Protected areas established in 1992
1992 establishments in Australia